Verkhny Kozmyash is a rural locality (a village) in Chernushinsky District, Perm Krai, Russia. The population was 62 as of 2010. There are 3 streets.

Geography 
Verkhny Kozmyash is located 20 km east of Chernushka (the district's administrative centre) by road. Nizhny Kozmyash is the nearest rural locality.

References 

Rural localities in Chernushinsky District